The CIGI Campus, located in Waterloo, Ontario, is a hub of academic study and policy-based research in global governance and international affairs. Currently, the campus contains its namesake Centre for International Governance Innovation (CIGI), a global think tank previously housed in the former Seagram Museum, and the Balsillie School of International Affairs (BSIA).

History 
In 2009, CIGI announced plans to house the BSIA within a "CIGI Campus" that would be built alongside its headquarters in Waterloo. The resulting $68 million complex received federal and provincial funding totalling $50 million through the Knowledge Infrastructure Program and Ontario's 2009 Budget. The City of Waterloo donated the land for the campus through a 99-year lease.

Toronto-based Kuwabara Payne McKenna Blumberg Architects was selected to design the CIGI Campus building in a classic Oxbridge style, complete with an inner courtyard and bell tower. Construction began in 2009 and substantially concluded in late 2011.

Features 
Within the CIGI Campus courtyard is a public art installation crafted by Richard Fleischner. The art piece highlights significant moments of progress in international governance, with copper markers located on an unseen world map.

The building also incorporates environmentally friendly green roofs, operable windows, energy-efficient in-slab cooling and heating systems, and an underground cistern to collect grey water for landscape irrigation. The building was constructed using a BubbleDeck system that reduces structural concrete usage, and as a whole, achieves a 50-percent energy reduction beyond the requirements of the National Building Code.

The campus also houses the CIGI Auditorium, a 250-seat theatre-style space for public lectures and events.

Occupants 
The CIGI Campus is home to academic and research programs that are partnerships between CIGI and other institutions. The BSIA, established in 2007 in a three-way partnership among the University of Waterloo, Wilfrid Laurier University and CIGI, was the first occupant of the campus in fall 2011. The school comprises roughly 60 percent of the campus building. Additional occupants on the campus include: Perimeter Institute, Capacity Canada, The Arctic Research Foundation and Innovation Asset Collective.

References

External links 
CIGI Campus Website
CIGI's Official Website
Balsillie School of International Affairs
CIGI Campus Flickr Group

2009 establishments in Ontario
Waterloo, Ontario
Buildings and structures in Waterloo, Ontario
Political and economic think tanks based in Canada